The 1943 IFA Shield Final was the 51st final of the IFA Shield, the second oldest football competition in India, and was contested between Kolkata clubs East Bengal and Police A.C. on 26 August 1943 at the Calcutta Ground in Kolkata.

East Bengal won the final 3–0 to claim their 1st IFA Shield title. Appa Rao, Fatik Sinha and A.C. Somana scored the three goals in the final as East Bengal became the fourth Indian team after Mohun Bagan, Mohammedan Sporting and Aryan to lift the IFA Shield title.

Route to the final

Match

Summary
The IFA Shield final began at the Calcutta Ground in Kolkata on 26 August 1943 in front of a packed crowd as East Bengal and Police A.C. faced each other. East Bengal reached their second consecutive final after defeating B & A Railway 7–1 in the semi final, having lost the previous one to Mohammedan Sporting in 1942. Police made their third appearance in the final after 1937 and 1939, being champions in 1939, after they defeated the reigning Calcutta Football League champions Mohun Bagan 1–0 in the semi final. East Bengal however, started the match positively as Appa Rao scored in the third minute of the match with a header after the ball rebounded off Police custodian Withers after he failed to save a powerful shot from Fatik Sinha. It was Fatik Sinha who double the lead in the second half as he headed home from close range. A.C. Somana made it three for East Bengal with a powerful shot after receiving a pass from Appa Rao as East Bengal became only the fourth Indian team to lift the IFA Shield title.

Details

References

External links
IFA Shield Finals – RSSSF

IFA Shield finals
1943–44 in Indian football
East Bengal Club matches
Football competitions in Kolkata